Sucoma Airport  is an airport serving the Nchalo Sugar Estate and the town of Nchalo, Republic of Malawi. The runway marked length is 800 meters (2620 feet), but it has overruns totals 1190 meters (3900 feet).

See also
Transport in Malawi
List of airports in Malawi

References

 Google Earth

External links
Nchalo Airport
OpenStreetMap - Nchalo
OurAirports - Nchalo

Airports in Malawi